73 (seventy-three) is the natural number following 72 and preceding 74. In English, it is the smallest natural number with twelve letters in its spelled out name.

In mathematics 
73 is the 21st prime number, and emirp with 37, the 12th prime number. It is also the eighth twin prime, with 71. It is the largest minimal primitive root in the first 100,000 primes; in other words, if  is one of the first one hundred thousand primes, then at least one of the numbers 2, 3, 4, 5, 6, ..., 73 is a primitive root modulo . 73 is also the smallest factor of the first composite generalized Fermat number in decimal: , and the smallest prime congruent to 1 modulo 24, as well as the only prime repunit in octal (1118). It is the fourth star number.

Notably, 73 is the sole Sheldon prime to contain both mirror and product properties:
73, as an emirp, has 37 as its dual permutable prime, a mirroring of its base ten digits, 7 and 3. 73 is the 21st prime number, while 37 is the 12th, which is a second mirroring; and
73 has a prime index of 21 = 7 × 3; a product property where the product of its base-10 digits is precisely its index in the sequence of prime numbers.

Arithmetically, from sums of 73 and 37 with their prime indexes, one obtains:

Other properties ligating 73 with 37 include:

Of the 7 binary digits representing 73, there are 3 ones. In addition to having prime factors 7 and 3, the number  represents the ternary (base-3) equivalent of the decimal numeral 7, that is to say: .

There are 73 three-dimensional arithmetic crystal classes that are part of 230 crystallographic space group types. These 73 groups are specifically symmorphic groups such that all operating lattice symmetries have one common fixed isomorphic point, with the remaining 157 groups nonsymmorphic (the 37th prime is 157). 

In moonshine theory of sporadic groups, 73 is the first non-supersingular prime greater than 71. All primes greater than or equal to 73 are non-supersingular, while 37, on the other hand, is the smallest prime number that is not supersingular.

73 is the largest member of the 17-integer matrix definite quadratic that represents all prime numbers: {2, 3, 5, 7, 11, 13, 17, 19, 23, 29, 31, 37, 41, 43, 47, 67, 73}.

In science 
The atomic number of tantalum

In astronomy 

 Messier object M73, a magnitude 9.0 apparent open cluster in the constellation Aquarius.
 The New General Catalogue object NGC 73, a barred spiral galaxy in the constellation Cetus.
 The number of seconds it took for the Space Shuttle Challenger OV-099 shuttle to explode after launch.
 73 is the number of rows in the 1,679-bit Arecibo message, sent to space in search for extraterrestrial intelligence.

In chronology 
The year AD 73, 73 BC, or 1973.
The number of days in 1/5 of a non-leap year.
The 73rd day of a non-leap year is March 14, also known as Pi Day.

In other fields 
73 is also:
The number of books in the Catholic Bible.
Amateur radio operators and other morse code users commonly use the number 73 as a "92 Code" abbreviation for "best regards", typically when ending a QSO (a conversation with another operator). These codes also facilitate communication between operators who may not be native English speakers. In Morse code, 73 is an easily recognized palindrome: ( - - · · ·     · · · - - ).
73 (also known as 73 Amateur Radio Today) was an amateur radio magazine published from 1960 to 2003.
73 was the number on the Torpedo Patrol (PT) boat in the TV show McHale's Navy.
The registry of the U.S. Navy's nuclear aircraft carrier , named after U.S. President George Washington.
No. 73 was the name of a 1980s children's television programme in the United Kingdom. It ran from 1982 to 1988 and starred Sandi Toksvig.
Pizza 73 is a Canadian pizza chain.
Game show Match Game '73 in 1973.
Fender Rhodes Stage 73 Piano.
Sonnet 73 by William Shakespeare.
The number of the French department Savoie.
On a CB radio, 10-73 means "speed trap at..."

In sports 

 In international curling competitions, each side is given 73 minutes to complete all of its throws.
 In baseball, the single-season home run record set by Barry Bonds in 2001.
 In basketball, the number of games the Golden State Warriors won in the 2015–16 season (73-9), the most wins in NBA history.
 NFL: In the 1940 NFL championship game, the Bears beat the Redskins 73–0, the largest score ever in an NFL game. (The Redskins won their previous regular season game, 7–3).

Popular culture

The Big Bang Theory
73 is Sheldon Cooper's favorite number in The Big Bang Theory. He first expresses his love for it in "The Alien Parasite Hypothesis". Jim Parsons was born in the year 1973. "The Alien Parasite Hypothesis" is the 73rd episode of The Big Bang Theory. He often wears a t-shirt with the number 73 on it.

See also 
 List of highways numbered 73

References 

Integers